The sarcophagus of Seti I is a life-size sarcophagus of the 19th Dynasty Pharaoh that was discovered in 1817 by the Italian explorer Giovanni Battista Belzoni in tomb KV17 in the Valley of the Kings, Egypt. Seti I is believed to have died in 1279 BC and the sarcophagus would have housed his coffin and mummy. It was bought by architect Sir John Soane in 1824 for £2000 after the British Museum turned it down citing Belzoni's steep price. It is currently displayed in the crypt section, called Sepulchral Chamber, of Sir John Soane's Museum in London. Over 3000 years old, the sarcophagus is one of the oldest museum objects in the United Kingdom in public collection.

Bibliography

References

External links
Sir John Soane's Museum

Archaeological artifacts
Ancient Egyptian sarcophagi
Egyptological collections in London
Sarcophagi
Nineteenth Dynasty of Egypt
Archaeological discoveries in Egypt
1817 archaeological discoveries
Collection of Sir John Soane's Museum
Sculptures of ancient Egypt
13th-century BC works
13th century BC in Egypt
Egyptian inscriptions